The Thirumohoor Kalamegaperumal Temple (also known as Thirumohoor or Tirumogoor temple) is a Hindu temple near Melur, Madurai district in the South Indian state of Tamil Nadu, is dedicated to the Hindu god Vishnu. Constructed in the Dravidian style of architecture, the temple is glorified in the Nalayira Divya Prabandham, the early medieval Tamil canon of the Alvar saints from the 6th–9th centuries CE. It is one of the 108 Divya Desams dedicated to Vishnu, who is worshipped as Kalamega Perumal and his consort Lakshmi as Mohanavalli Thayar. As per Hindu legend, the presiding deity is believed to have appeared as the divine enchantress Mohini to allure the asuras to support the devas, the celestial deities. The temple is also known as Mohanapuram and Mohanakshetram.

A granite wall surrounds the temple, enclosing all its shrines and three of its four bodies of water. The temple has a five-tiered rajagopuram, the temple's gateway tower and a huge temple tank in front of it. The temple is believed to have been built by the Pandyas, with later additions from the Madurai Nayaks.

Six daily rituals and three yearly festivals are held at the temple, of which the Brahmotsavam, celebrated during the Tamil month of Vaikasi (April–May), being the most prominent. The temple is maintained and administered by the Hindu Religious and Endowment Board of the Government of Tamil Nadu.

Legend

As per Hindu legend, once, an asura by the name of Bhasmasura did penance. Shiva granted him a boon that when he touched anyone's head, that person would turn to ashes. Bhasmasura wanted to test the boon and wanted to touch the head of Shiva. A bewildered Shiva ran to seek the favour of Vishnu, who took the form of the damsel Mohini. She lured Bhasmasura with her dance and made Bhasmasura touch his head with his hand. The asura Bhasmasura was thus defeated. The place where Mohini lured (meaning Moham) came to be known as Thirumohur.

According to another legend, there was a war between the devas (gods) and asuras (demons) before the churning of the Ocean of Milk for amrita (elixir of eternal life). The asuras were able to overpower the devas, and thus the devas sought Vishnu's help. During the Samudra Manthanam, Vishnu appeared as Mohini to lure the asuras and denied them the elixir, allowing the devas to gain the upper hand. It is believed that Thirumohur is the place of the event.

History

Sangam literature details about this place being prosperous during the time. The documentation from Ptolemy (c. CE 100 – c. 170) also makes reference to this place. Inscription from the temple - South Outer wall's inside - Archaeological report on Epigraphy - 330 of 1918 - and Tamil Nadu State Archaeology's Madurai District Inscriptions - Vol. I - page no. 229 - Sl. no. 141 of 2003 - identifies the builder of the temple as sri Kaala Maegam alias Kaangaeyan during the reign of Sadaiya Varman Sundhara Pandiyan (Later Pandiya king) in his regnal year 7 + 1 (i.e. after the 7th year was over and the eighth year was in progress) which is identified as CE 1259.  This inscription besides identifying the above speaks of an endowment of ponds and adjoining areas duly specifying the boundaries of the land. The current structure is believed to have been built by the Madurai Nayaks. During the later part, there were additions made by the Marudu brothers, whose images are also housed in the temple. Thirumohur was an impregnable fort during the period of British. During the Carnatic Wars, there was an attempt made by a Muslim general, but it was repulsed by the local devotees. The inscriptions from the period of Nayaks have been recorded by the Archaeological survey.

During Carnatic Wars in 1755, British general colonel heron looted the idols and treasures from this temple. When he was moving away with all treasures with camels, british force was attacked by Kallars, who took back the idols and temple treasures.

In memory of this event, even today god in this temple used to come like a Kallar man. Also the rights for pulling temple car given to Kallars of Tirumokur, Poolampatti, Kodikkulam, Chittampatti, Vovaal Thottam and Aalinangarai.

Architecture

The temple is situated on a  land area, and has a 5 tier rajagopuram. The temple is more than 2000 years old and has been referred to in akanaṉūṟu, Padhitrupathu, maduraikanchi and also in one of the five great epics of Tamil literature, silappatikaram. There are four prakarams (closed precincts of a temple) inside the temple. The main deity (mulavar) is Kalamegaperumal in panchayudha kolam and in a standing posture, Thayar - Mogavalli, Utsavar - Thirumogur Aabthan, Theertham - Kshirabtha Pushkarini, Thala Viruksham - Vilvam and Vimanam - Kethaki Vimanam. The Prathanasayana appearance of the main deity is not found anywhere in 108 Divya Desam temples. The temple has a five-tiered rajagopuram (gateway tower). There are columned pillars in the hall leading to the Garuda hall, which also has a small gopuram. The sanctum houses the shrine of Kalamegha and also has the images of Bhudevi and Sridevi. The major feature is that the unlike other temples, the goddesses do not touch the feet of the presiding deity. A separate shrine accommodates the image of Anantasayi Vishnu. The consort of the presiding deity, Tirumohurvalli (also called Mohanavalli) is housed in a separate shrine.

To the front of the image of the Sudarshana Chakra stands the deity Chakratalvar, and present on the back is Narasingha Perumal, situated amidst 48 apsaras.  Inside the six circles that are present, there are 16 weapons with 154 letters present. The letters are believed to be text from the Bhijakshara Mantra. Perumal is depicted with 16 hands and three eyes glowing like fire.

Festivals and religious practices

The temple priests perform the puja (rituals) during festivals and on a daily basis based on Pancharatra Agama. As at other Vishnu temples of Tamil Nadu, the priests belong to the Vaishnava community, from the Brahmin class. The temple rituals are performed six times a day: Ushathkalam at 7 a.m., Kalasanthi at 8:00 a.m., Uchikalam at 12:00 p.m., Sayarakshai at 6:00 p.m., Irandamkalam at 7:00 p.m. and Ardha Jamam at 10:00 p.m. Each ritual has three steps: alangaram (decoration), neivethanam (food offering) and deepa aradanai (waving of lamps) for both Kalamega Perumal and Mohanavalli. During the last step of worship, nadasvaram (pipe instrument) and tavil (percussion instrument) are played, religious instructions in the Vedas (sacred text) are recited by priests, and worshippers prostrate themselves in front of the temple mast. There are weekly, monthly and fortnightly rituals performed in the temple. The major festival is the ten-day Vaikasi Brammotsavam celebrated during May–June. The other festivals are Vaikunta Ekadashi (December–January), Gajendra Moksham during the Masi Poornima day in February – March, two day Panguni Thirukalyanam (March–April) and Krishna Jayanthi.

Literary mention
The temple is glorified in the verses of Nalayira Divya Prabandham by Tirumangai Alvar and Nammalvar. The temple is classified as a Divya Desam, one of the 108 Vishnu temples that are mentioned in the book. Manavala Mamunigal, Kalamegha Pulavar, Tiruninravur Tirumalai and Pillai Perumal Iyengar have composed verses on the deity. Out of the eighteen Puranas, Brahmanda Purana and Matsya Purana make specific mention about Thirumohur.

References

External links

 
Hindu temples in Madurai district
Hindu temples in Madurai
Tourist attractions in Madurai
Religious buildings and structures in Madurai